NGC 7025  is a spiral galaxy located about 210 million light-years away from Earth in the constellation Delphinus. NGC 7025 is also classified as a LINER galaxy. The galaxy has an estimated diameter of 161,830 light-years. It was discovered by astronomer Albert Marth on September 17, 1863.

See also 
 List of NGC objects (7001–7840)
 NGC 7013
 NGC 7001

References

External links 
 
  

Spiral galaxies
LINER galaxies
Delphinus (constellation)
7025
11681
66151
Astronomical objects discovered in 1863